James Michael Aloysius Bradford (born 16 March 1954), known as Jimmy Nail, is an English singer-songwriter, actor, film producer, and television writer. He played the role of Leonard "Oz" Osborne in the television show Auf Wiedersehen, Pet and the title role in Spender.  He also recorded a 1992 number one single, "Ain't No Doubt". His role as Agustin, the oily crooner in the 1996 film Evita, gave him international recognition.

Early life
James Michael Aloysius Bradford was born in Newcastle upon Tyne to father Jimmy and mother Laura. His father was an Irish Catholic shipyard worker, amateur boxer, and professional footballer. Nail describes himself as an angry child who was expelled from secondary school for setting fire to curtains. When he was 13, his sister, Shelagh, died at the age of 20. He later spent time drinking, fighting, and generally rebelling against authority. He was involved in a fight after a football match and was sent to prison. After being released he worked in a glass factory. While opening a crate of glass he stood on a six-inch spike that went through his foot and thereafter was called "Nail", a name he later adopted professionally. Also at that time he played guitar in a rock band called the King Crabs. His sister Val McLane was an actress and later became Head of Drama at Sunderland University.

Career

Television
Nail's partner, Miriam, encouraged him to audition for a television show, and although he had no experience as an actor, he won the role of Leonard Jeffrey "Oz" Osborne on Auf Wiedersehen, Pet, an ITV comedy drama about construction workers on the job, first in Germany, then other countries.

In 2000 he began work on reviving the Auf Wiedersehen, Pet series, this time for the BBC. It was filmed in Middlesbrough and Arizona in 2001 and aired in 2002, with audience figures of 13 million. Another series saw the brickies holed up in Havana, and the final two-hour instalment, set in Laos, broadcast over Christmas 2004 attracting over seven million viewers.

In 2008, Nail created and starred as Phil Parker in Parents of the Band, a 6 × 30 mins series on BBC1, broadcast between November 2008 and January 2009. The series revolved around a group of teenagers who formed a band just for their own enjoyment, and their parents, who fully expected them to be the next Led Zeppelin. Ratings were disappointing, around three million.

Music
Nail had pop hits with "Ain't No Doubt", co-written by Nail, Danny Schogger, Guy Pratt and Charlie Dore, "Crocodile Shoes", and "Love Don't Live Here Anymore". His album Growing Up in Public (east/west 1992) featured Gary Moore, David Gilmour, Elliot Randall and George Harrison. Crocodile Shoes (East West, 1994) was based on the BBC television series of the same name, in which he played an English country songwriter. The album sold more than one million copies in the UK. Big River featured guitarist Mark Knopfler. Ten Great Songs and an OK Voice (Papillon, 2001) was an album composed of cover songs. Nail sang on the film soundtrack for Evita.

With Tim Healy, Nail has been involved with the Sammy Johnson Memorial Fund, in memory of their friend and colleagues, established to help young talent in North East England. He has participated in the Sunday for Sammy benefit concerts.

Theatre and film
Nail came out of retirement to act and sing in The Last Ship, a musical by Sting about the shipbuilders of Newcastle-upon-Tyne, the hometown of both Nail and Sting. Sting grew up in Wallsend, down the street from the shipyards. Nail worked in the shipyards and is the son of a shipyard foreman. The show opened in Chicago. On Broadway, when ticket sales began to drop, Sting replaced Nail to try to save the musical, but it ended after a short run. Nail sang on the Original Broadway Cast Recording and on Sting's album, The Last Ship.

He had been due to reprise his role in the UK premiere at Northern Stage on 12 March 2018. The show's producer Karl Sydow stated: "After protracted negotiations carried out in good faith, we regret to announce the production's offer of employment to Jimmy Nail has been withdrawn. Joe McGann will replace him when the show opens in Newcastle in March. Nail said "I was very much looking forward to appearing in Sting's The Last Ship, particularly here in my home city, sadly that's not to be." Nail played Parson Nathaniel in War of the Worlds alongside David Essex at the Dominion Theatre, London in 2016.

He played gamekeeper "Rabbetts" in Danny, the Champion of the World, based on the novel of the same name by Roald Dahl.

Nail had a lead singing role in the 1996 film adaptation of Evita.

Defamation lawsuit
In 2004, Nail successfully sued News Group Newspapers and Harper Collins Publishers. The lawsuit concerned false and defamatory allegations made two years before in an article in News of the World and Nailed, a biography which was the newspaper's source for the claims. He described reading the article as one of the worst experiences of his life. He reportedly received damages of £30,000.

Personal life
Nail has two children and lives in London. He is a Newcastle United fan.

Filmography

Film

Television

Discography

 Take It or Leave It (1986)
 Growing Up in Public (1992)
 Crocodile Shoes (1994)
 Big River (1995)
 Crocodile Shoes II (1996)
 Tadpoles in a Jar (1999)
 10 Great Songs and an OK Voice (2001)

References

Sources
 Larkin, Colin. The Encyclopedia of Popular Music, 3rd edition, Macmillan, 1998.

External links
 

1954 births
20th-century British composers
20th-century English male actors
20th-century English singers
20th-century English writers
21st-century composers
21st-century English male actors
21st-century English singers
21st-century English writers
English country guitarists
English country singer-songwriters
English autobiographers
English film score composers
English male film score composers
English male film actors
English male television actors
English people of Irish descent
English pop guitarists
English male guitarists
English pop rock singers
English rock guitarists
English male singer-songwriters
English soul singers
English television producers
English television writers
Living people
London Records artists
Musicians from Newcastle upon Tyne
British rock and roll musicians
Soul guitarists
Virgin Records artists
Warner Music Group artists
20th-century British guitarists
21st-century British guitarists
British male television writers
20th-century British male singers
21st-century British male singers
Actors from County Durham